Energía is the second studio album by Colombian singer J Balvin. It was released on June 24, 2016, by Capitol Latin and Universal Music Group. Balvin received a nomination for the Lo Nuestro Award for Urban Album of the Year.

Commercial performance 
Energía debuted at number 38 on the Billboard 200, with 12,000 equivalent album units; selling 7,000 copies in its first week. The album was the first Balvin's album to debut at number one on the Billboard Top Latin Albums.

Accolades
Energia was listed number four on Rolling Stones 10 Best Latin albums of 2016, with the reviewer calling the album Balvin's "breakthrough" continuing to praise the album's lead single "Ginza", stating "with its deliciously liquid beat, is among the finest three minutes in reggaetón history."

Track listing

Charts

Weekly charts

Year-end charts

Certifications and sales

Energia Tour
Balvin embarked on the Energia Tour in order to support the album. The tour began on September 29, 2016 in Culiacán and concluded on January 28, 2018 in London.

Set list
This set list is representative of the show on February 25, 2017 in Viña del Mar, Chile. It is not representative of all concerts for the duration of the tour.

 "Ginza"
 "Safari"
 "Tranquila"
 "Bobo"
 "Yo Te Lo Dije"
 "Sin Compromiso"
 "Sorry (Latino Remix)"
 "6 AM"
 "Otra Vez"
 "Ay Vamos"
 "Snapchat"
 "Travesuras"
 "Lean On (Remix)"
 "Pierde los Modales"
 "Sigo Extrañándote"
 "Acércate"

Tour dates

Cancelled shows

Notes

References 

2016 albums
J Balvin albums
Spanish-language albums
Capitol Latin albums
Latin Grammy Award for Best Urban Music Album
Albums produced by Pharrell Williams
Albums produced by Sky Rompiendo